Giuseppe Brenna (4 December 1898 – 25 February 1980) was an Italian racing cyclist. He rode in the 1924 Tour de France.

References

1898 births
1980 deaths
Italian male cyclists
Place of birth missing